Guardigli is an Italian surname. Notable people with the surname include:

Fabio Guardigli (born 1968), Sammarinese alpine skier
Francesca Guardigli (born 1973), Sammarinese tennis player
Luigi Guardigli (1923–2008), Italian painter and mosaicist

Italian-language surnames